This is a complete list of fellows of the Royal Society elected in its first year, 1660.

Founder fellows 
 William Ball (1627–1690)
 William Brouncker, 2nd Viscount Brouncker (1620–1684)
 Jonathan Goddard (1617–1675)
 Abraham Hill (1633–1721)
 Sir Robert Moray (1608–1673)
 Sir Paul Neile (1613–1686)
 Sir William Petty (1623–1687)
 Lawrence Rooke (1622–1662)

Original fellows 
 John Austin (1613–1669)
 George Bate (1608–1668)
 Giles Rawlins (d. 1662)

References

1660
1660 in science
1660 in England